Thomas Turnbull (1824–1907) was a notable New Zealand architect.

He was born in Glasgow, Lanarkshire, Scotland in 1824. 

After qualifying as an architect, Turnbull moved to Melbourne, Australia in 1851. Then in 1861 he moved to San Francisco, going into partnership with firstly, A H Jordan, and then with Thomas England, taking over the business in 1869 when England died. During his time in San Francisco Turnbull designed several prominent buildings including the first Cliff House (1863), Trinity Church and the Market Street Presbyterian Church. After a large earthquake in 1868, local architects formed the Architectural Association of San Francisco and held a conference to discuss how to build to resist earthquakes. Turnbull became the association's secretary. In 1869 Turnbull designed a large building of four storeys plus a basement and an attic for H H Bancroft & Co, a printing company. The building was brick with an iron front and floors bolted with long iron rods. The San Francisco Chronicle reported:"The style of architecture will be entirely different from any other building in this city.[...] Every precaution has been made to procure the best material and erect the structure in a manner which will render it as thoroughly earthquake-proof as possible."Turnbull moved to New Zealand in 1871 and settled in Wellington. He worked for a year for the government's Colonial Architect William Clayton before setting up his own practice.  He was the first president of the Wellington Association of Architects, and a member of the Wellington City Council in 1891. Turnbull designed three of the four buildings which make up the Old Bank Arcade, St John's Church and St Peter's Church in Willis Street, Wesley Methodist Church in Taranaki Street as well as many other commercial premises in Wellington. 

Turnbull maintained his interest in earthquake-proofing buildings after his arrival in New Zealand. In 1888 he presented a paper at the Philosophical Society in Wellington, asserting that masonry buildings properly constructed with good bricks and mortar, reinforced with iron built into the walls and joists fitted with wrought-iron anchors, would survive a large earthquake.

His youngest son, William Turnbull, joined his practice in 1891 and thereafter the firm was known as Thomas Turnbull & Son.

Turnbull died in 1907, survived by his wife and five children.

Public buildings in New Zealand designed by Thomas Turnbull (incomplete list)

References

1824 births
1907 deaths
New Zealand architects
Scottish emigrants to New Zealand
Architects from Glasgow
Wellington City Councillors
19th-century New Zealand architects
New Zealand ecclesiastical architects